Frank Charles Bayliss (5 July 1876 in Birmingham – 30 May 1938 in London) was a British rugby union player. He competed at the 1900 Summer Olympics and won silver as part of the Great Britain team in what was the first rugby union competition at an Olympic Games.

References

External links

1876 births
1938 deaths
Olympic rugby union players of Great Britain
British rugby union players
Olympic silver medallists for Great Britain
Rugby union players at the 1900 Summer Olympics
Rugby union players from Birmingham, West Midlands